This article covers events in 2020 in continental European music, arranged in geographical order.

Events
 8 January 
 The Teatro San Cassiano in Venice, Italy, names the Academy of Ancient Music as its first associate ensemble.
 The Zurich Festival {Festspiele Zürich} announces that its festival will be discontinued after 2020, because of the lack of long-term financial support.
 Dutch composer Martijn Padding receives the Andreaspenning award at the Concertgebouw, in recognition of his services to the musical life of Amsterdam.
 13 January – The Bavarian Radio Symphony Orchestra announces that it is to award its Karl Amadeus Hartmann Medal posthumously to Mariss Jansons.
 26 February
 José Manuel Rodríguez Uribes, the Spanish minister of culture, withdraws the invitation to operatic tenor Plácido Domingo to perform at the Teatro de la Zarzuela, following the release of an American Guild of Musical Artists report on allegations of sexual misconduct against Domingo.
 The Landestheater Coburg announces the appointment of Daniel Carter as its new Generalmusikdirektor, with effect from 1 February 2021.
18 March – The Eurovision Song Contest 2020, scheduled to take place in Rotterdam is cancelled due of the COVID-19 pandemic in Europe – the first cancellation in the contest's 64-year history.

Scandinavia

Top hits
Danish number-one hits of 2020
Finnish number-one singles of 2020, Finnish number-one albums of 2020
Norwegian number-one songs in 2020
Swedish number-one singles and albums in 2020

Netherlands
Dutch number-one singles of 2020

Ireland

UK

Germany
German number-one hits of 2020

Switzerland and Austria
Swiss number-one hits of 2020

France
French number-one hits of 2020

Italy
Italian number-one hits of 2020

Eastern Europe/ Balkans
List of Polish number-one singles of 2020
Czech number-one songs of the 2020s
Hungarian number-one singles of the 2020s

Musical films
If It Were Love (Si c'était de l'amour) (France)

Deaths
1 January – Damir Mihanović, 58, Croatian comedian, actor and musician (lung cancer)
3 January – Bo Winberg, 80, Swedish guitarist (The Spotnicks)
10 January – Marc Morgan, 57, Belgian singer-songwriter
14 January – Guy Deplus, 95, French clarinetist
19 January – Guy Thomas, 85, Belgian-born French songwriter.
21 January
Herbert Baumann, 94, German composer and conductor
Meritxell Negre, 48, Spanish singer (cancer)
4 February – Volker David Kirchner, 77, German violist and composer
26 February
Eduardo Bort, 72, Spanish guitarist
Hans Deinzer, 86, German clarinetist
Sergei Dorensky, 88, Russian pianist
1 March – Peter Wieland, 89, German singer and entertainer
8 March – Martin Davorin-Jagodić, 84, Croatian composer
9 March – Alain Marcel, 68, Algerian-born French actor, composer and musical theatre producer
10 March – Beba Selimović, 80, Bosnian sevdalinka singer
14 March – Eva Pilarová, 80, Czech singer
16 March
Sergio Bassi, 69, Italian folk singer-songwriter (COVID-19)
, 55, Russian musician and visual artist
18 March – Jean Leber, 80–81, French violinist (COVID-19)
20 March
Enrique del Portal, 87, Spanish operatic tenor
Gino Volpe, 77, Italian singer-songwriter, heart attack.
21 March – Hellmut Stern, 91, German violinist
24 March – Gerard Schurmann, 96, Dutch-British composer and conductor (The Bedford Incident, Attack on the Iron Coast, Claretta).
31 March – Zoltán Peskó, 83, Hungarian conductor and composer.
1 April – Dieter Reith, 82, German pianist and organist
4 April – Patrick Gibson, 64, French drummer and singer (Gibson Brothers), COVID-19.
7 April – André Stordeur, 79, Belgian electronic musician.
9 April – Bert van de Kamp, 73, Dutch music journalist
14 April – Kerstin Meyer, 92, Swedish mezzo-soprano.
16 April 
Christophe, 74, French singer-songwriter (COPD)
Dušan Vančura, 82, Czech singer, double-bassist and lyricist (Spirituál kvintet)
9 June – Pau Donés, 43, Spanish singer songwriter and guitarist
5 October – Béatrice Arnac, 89, French actress and singer
7 October – Jean Martin, 92, French pianist
11 October – Boro Drljača, 79, Serbian folk singer
18 October – Alfredo Cerruti, 78, Italian television author, music producer, and singer
19 October
, 83, Lithuanian opera singer
Gianni Dei, 79, Italian actor and singer
25 October 
Dolores Abril, 85, Spanish singer and actress
Jan Boerman, 97, Dutch electronic music composer 
György Fischer, 85, Hungarian pianist and conductor
1 November 
Esteban Santos, 69, Spanish pop singer
, 88, Czech opera singer
5 November – Reynaert, 65, Belgian singer (COVID-19)
7 November – Brian Coll, 79, Irish musician
13 November – Kićo Slabinac76, Croatian pop singer

References

External links
 European Music Council 

European